Joe Cannon Stadium is a baseball stadium in Hanover, Maryland.  It is the home field of the Coppin State Eagles baseball team of the Division I Northeast Conference.  It was also formerly the home field of the Baltimore Dodgers of the Cal Ripken Collegiate Baseball League, a collegiate summer baseball league.  Joe Cannon Stadium also plays host to many high school and amateur league games.  The stadium holds 1,500 spectators.  It is named after former-Major League Baseball player Joe Cannon.

See also
 List of NCAA Division I baseball venues

References

College baseball venues in the United States
Coppin State Eagles baseball
Baseball venues in Maryland
1991 establishments in Maryland
Sports venues completed in 1991